Fred Lookout (ca. 1861 – 1949) was the last hereditary chief of the Osage Nation, a Dhegiha Siouan-speaking people and a federally recognized Native American tribe based in Oklahoma.

Early life 
Fred Lookout was born around 1861 near present-day Independence, Kansas. His paternal grandmother raised him, since his mother died when he was an infant. The Indian Agent to the Osage Nation selected him to attend the Carlisle Indian Industrial School. He studied there from which he from 1879 to 1884. In 1884, he returned home to his reservation upon the death of his father and refused to return to the school. He married Julia Pryor and settled as a farmer near Pawhuska.

Political career 
Lookout entered tribal politics in 1908, winning election as assistant principal chief. He did not run for reelection in 1910. In 1914, he was appointed principal chief by U.S. Secretary of the Interior Walter L. Fisher, replacing Bacon Rind, who was removed amidst a scandal involving oil leases. Lookout lost his reelection attempt later that year but won a two-year term as principal chief in 1916. Thereafter, he served on the tribal council from 1920 to 1922. He served again as principal chief from 1926 to his death in 1949.

Death 
Fred Lookout died in August 28, 1949.

References

Bibliography
 

Osage people
Native American leaders
1861 births
1949 deaths
Carlisle Indian Industrial School alumni
People from Independence, Kansas